Lambert may refer to

People
Lambert (name), a given name and surname
 Lambert, Bishop of Ostia (c. 1036–1130), became Pope Honorius II
Lambert, Margrave of Tuscany (fl. 929–931), also count and duke of Lucca
Lambert (pianist), stage-name of German pianist and composer Paul Lambert

Places

United States
Lambert, Mississippi, a town
Lambert, Missouri, a village
St. Louis Lambert International Airport, St. Louis, Missouri
Lambert, Montana, a rural town in Montana
Lambert, Oklahoma, a town
Lambert Township, Red Lake County, Minnesota
Lambert Castle, a mansion in Paterson, New Jersey
Lambert Creek, San Mateo County, California

Elsewhere
Lambert Gravitational Centre, the geographical centre of Australia
Lambert (lunar crater), named after Johann Heinrich Lambert
Lambert (Martian crater), named after Johann Heinrich Lambert

Transportation
Lambert (automobile), a defunct American automobile brand
Lambert (cyclecar), British three-wheeled cyclecar
Lambert, one of the GWR 3031 Class locomotives that were built for and run on the Great Western Railway between 1891 and 1915, formerly named Trafalgar before 1901

Other uses
 Lambert (unit), a non-SI unit of luminance named after Johann Heinrich Lambert
 Lambert (grape), another name for the German/Italian wine grape Trollinger
 Lambert v. California, court case regarding legal notice
 Lambert W function, mathematical definition of a product log named after Johann Heinrich Lambert
 Lambert the Sheepish Lion, a 1952 Disney animated short film directed by Jack Hannah

See also
Foot-lambert, an American customary unit of luminance named after Johann Heinrich Lambert
Lambert projection (disambiguation), a series of geographic map projections named after Johann Heinrich Lambert
Saint-Lambert (disambiguation)
Lambrecht (disambiguation)